Sintok is a small town Kubang Pasu District, Kedah, Malaysia. Universiti Utara Malaysia (UUM) is situated here.

Sintok is located about 52 kilometres from Alor Setar City and about twelve kilometres from Changlun Town. Sintok is reachable via Kuala Perlis-Changlun-Sintok expressway and via a road from Padang Terap.

History 
The name "Sintok" is taken from the name of a type of tree. The town was originally a remote settlement area for tin miners. However, due to its close proximity to the border of Malaysia-Thailand, Sintok was exposed to threats from the banned communist group. Hence, the government had to migrate all the original residents to a safer area, and declared the town are as a 'black area'. History recorded many killings of members of the security forces in the area.

By mid 1980s, the federal and state government agreed on building a university in Sintok. The university was named Universiti Utara Malaysia (UUM), literally translated as "Northern University of Malaysia", and construction started in the late 1980s to replace the temporary campus in Bandar Baru Darul Aman, Jitra.

As a memorial to the sacrifice by the security forces, a memorial structure was built in that UUM campus. A list of names of the members of the security forces that was killed by the communists was placed at this memorial structure.

The establishment of UUM campus has expedited the growth of new settlements like Bandar Baru Sintok and Bukit Kachi which is located opposite of Sungai Badak Forest Reserve.

External links
 Official website for Universiti Utara Malaysia

Kubang Pasu District
Towns in Kedah